Rohrbach-lès-Bitche (literally Rohrbach near Bitche; ; Lorraine Franconian: Roerbach) is a commune in the Moselle department of the Grand Est administrative region in north-eastern France.

The village belongs to the Pays de Bitche.

Geography
Rohrbach-lès-Bitche is crossed from west to east by the road connecting Sarreguemines to Bitche. The road towards Sarre-Union branches off in the centre of the village.

Located in the open country, at an elevation of around 260 metres, the village is dominated to the west by the 360-metre-tall Guckenberg, the last hill of the Lorraine plateau. It is one of the earliest villages of the Pays de Bitche. The Vosges pink sandstone appears on the outskirts of the commune, but is mostly covered by forest.

See also
 Communes of the Moselle department

References

External links
 

Communes of Moselle (department)